The 2012–13 Xerez CD season is the 66th season in club history.

Review and events

Matches

Legend

Segunda División

Copa del Rey

Squad

Squad, matches played and goals scored

Minutes played

Starting 11

Bookings

Sources

Xerez CD
Xerez CD seasons